() is a Catalan-language soap opera. It aired from 2001 to 2002 on TV3.

Premise 
The fiction follows the lives of three families during the Francoist dictatorship: the Dalmau-Muntaner, representatives of the Catalan bourgeoisie; the Comes, a Catalan artisan family, and the Hernández-Utrera, representatives of the immigrant working class, intermingling the grand narrative of history and the little stories of characters' daily lives.

While largely set in the Francoist dictatorship, the fiction eventually spanned to the marriage of Cristina de Borbón and Iñaki Urdangarín in 1997.

Production and release 
It premiered on 17 January 2001. Consisting of fifty three 50-minute long episodes, the broadcasting run ended on 10 April 2002.

The series sparked a spin-off, 16 dobles.

References 
Citations

Bibliography
 
 
 

Television shows set in Catalonia
2001 Spanish television series debuts
2002 Spanish television series endings
2000s Spanish drama television series
Spanish television soap operas
Catalan television programmes
Television series set in the 20th century
Television series by Diagonal TV
Catalan-language television shows